Cufruta was an ancient Roman-Berber civitas in the province of Byzacena. It was also the seat of a Roman Catholic diocese.

Cufruta was located in what is modern Tunisia. It was home to a former titular see of the Roman Catholic Church.

There are two known bishops of this diocese. Feliciano took part in the Council of Carthage of 403 and the conference in the same city in 411. Then, among the Catholic bishops summoned to Carthage in 484 by the Vandal king Huneric was Eliodoro.

Today Cufruta survives as titular bishopric, and the current bishop is Arkadiusz Okroj, auxiliary bishop of Pelplin.

Bishops
Feliciano (403–411)
Eliodoro (484)
Stanislaus Joseph Brzana  (1964–1968)
József Kacziba (1969–1989)
Tadeusz Pieronek (1992–2018)
Arkadiusz Okroj (2019-)

References 

Catholic titular sees in Africa
Ancient Berber cities
Roman towns and cities in Tunisia
Archaeological sites in Tunisia